Duplication, duplicate, and duplicator may refer to:

Biology and genetics 
 Gene duplication, a process which can result in free mutation
 Chromosomal duplication, which can cause Bloom and Rett syndrome
 Polyploidy, a phenomenon also known as ancient genome duplication
 Enteric duplication cysts, certain portions of the gastrointestinal tract
 Diprosopus, a form of cojoined twins also known as craniofacial duplication
 Diphallia, a medical condition also known as penile duplication

Computing 
 Duplicate code, a source code sequence that occurs more than once in a program
 Duplicate characters in Unicode, pairs of single Unicode code points that are canonically equivalent. The reason for this are compatibility issues with legacy systems
 Data redundancy, either wanted or unwanted (in which case one resorts to data deduplication)
 Content copying through cut, copy, and paste
 File copying

Mathematics 
 Duplication matrix, a linear transformation dealing with half-vectorization
 Doubling the cube, a problem in geometry also known as duplication of the cube
 A type of multiplication theorem called the Legendre duplication formula or simply "duplication formula"

Technology 
 Duplicating machines, machines and processes designed to reproduce printed material, photocopying being among the best-known today; see also List of duplicating processes
 Loop bin duplicator, a device designed to copy pre-recorded audio tapes
 Double track, a method of railway design also known as track duplication
 In road construction, conversion of a single carriageway into Dual carriageway

Art and fiction 
 Duplicate (1998 film), a Bollywood film directed by Mahesh Bhatt
 Duplicate (2009 film), a 2009 Malayalam film
Duplicates, a 1992 television film starring Gregory Harrison and Kim Greist
 The Duplicate, a 1988 children's book by William Sleater
 Batman Duplicate, a villain in Batman: The Animated Series
 "The Duplicate Man", a 1964 episode of The Outer Limits
 The duplicator machine in Calvin and Hobbes
 "Duplicate", a song by White Town from Peek & Poke
 "Duplicates", a song by We Are the Physics from We Are the Physics Are OK at Music

Other uses 
 Duplicate publication, the publication same intellectual material by the same author twice
 Reduplication, a morphological process in linguistics
 Duplicate bridge, a popular variant of contract bridge
 Duplicate Scrabble, a Scrabble variant popular in French and some other languages
 "Decouple, duplicate, discriminate," the "three Ds" articulated by Madeleine Albright as necessary for NATO to avoid
 Duplicate, another term for Body double in films

See also 
 Clone, the process of producing similar populations of genetically identical individuals that occurs in nature when organisms such as bacteria, insects or plants reproduce asexually
 Copy (disambiguation)
 Doppelgänger, a paranormal double of a living person
dup (disambiguation)
dupe (disambiguation)
 Redundancy (disambiguation)
 Symmetry, has two meanings. The first is a vague sense of harmonious and beautiful proportion and balance. The second is an exact mathematical "patterned self-similarity" that can be demonstrated with the rules of a formal system, such as geometry or physics